AAFA may refer to:

Asthma and Allergy Foundation of America
American Apparel and Footwear Association
American Academy of the Fine Arts
American Amateur Football Association - the former name of the United States Soccer Federation